Altenburger Land is a district in Thuringia, Germany. It is bounded by (from the west and clockwise) the district of Greiz, the Burgenlandkreis (Saxony-Anhalt), and the districts Leipzig, Mittelsachsen and Zwickau in Saxony. The district is a member of the Central German Metropolitan Region.

Geography 

Altenburger Land is the easternmost district of Thuringia. It is largely agricultural with three quarters of the total area being used for agriculture. In contrast, forests make up only around 10% of the area, especially in the south of the district there are only few forests. This can be explained by a high soil fertility with a Loess-layer of up to 3.5 meters.

The main river is the Pleiße, a tributary of the White Elster, crossing the district from south to north. The hilly Osterland constituting the northernmost foothills of the Ore Mountains slopes gently away to the plains of eastern Saxony-Anhalt.

History 

The region on the Pleiße River was part of a huge forest, where the Thuringii formed the Thuringian Kingdom. After this was in 531 taken over by the Franks, Slavic people were also moving in. Thuringians reestablished independent rule. The castle of Altenburg already existed in the 10th century, it became an imperial seat. In the following centuries German settlers from other parts moved in. It was part of the Margravate of Meissen in the 14th century. At this time most of the forests were cleared.

The town of Altenburg and the surrounding lands were the tiny Duchy of Saxe-Altenburg from 1826 to 1918; afterwards it was a state within the Weimar Republic for a short time, before it was dissolved in 1922 in order to join the Free State of Thuringia.

The district in its present borders was established in 1922 under the name "Altenburg". In 1952 there was an administrative reform splitting the districts into two smaller units, called "Altenburg" and "Schmölln". They were merged again in 1994, but now under the name Altenburger Land.

Coat of arms 

The coat of arms displays:
 The red rose stands for the Burgraviate of Altenburg and is also part of the coat of arms of the city of Altenburg
 The lion, which was the symbol of the reeves of Plauen; they had great power in the region during the 14th and 15th centuries
 The black and gold stripes with the green ring was the coat of arms of the Saxon Wettin dynasty
 The red acorn symbolises the skat game, which was invented in Altenburg in 1813

Towns and municipalities

References

External links 
  (German, English)